Epidromia consperata is a moth of the family Erebidae first described by Paul Dognin in 1912. It is found in Brazil, Colombia, Costa Rica, Ecuador, Guyana and Venezuela.

Adults have a very dark blackish-brown ground colour, shaded by pale blue-grey scales.

References

Moths described in 1912
Calpinae